The Belgium women's national field hockey team is coached by Raoul Ehren.

Competitive record
 Champions   Runners-up   Third place   Fourth place

Summer Olympics

Hockey World Cup
{| class="wikitable" style="text-align: center;"
|-
!colspan=9|FIH World Cup record
|-
!Year
!Round
!Position
!
!
!*
!
!
!
|-
|  1974
| Group stage
| 5th place
| 6
| 4
| 1
| 1
| 13
| 2
|-
|  1976 
| Semifinal
| 4th place
| 6
| 3
| 0
| 3
| 14
| 8
|-bgcolor=#cc9966
|  1978
| Semifinal
| 3rd| 7| 3| 1| 3| 6| 10'|-
|  1981
| Group stage
| 8th place
| 7
| 2
| 1
| 4
| 7
| 16
|-
| 1983 - 2010
| colspan=8| did not qualify|-
|  2014 
| Group stage 
| 12th place
| 6 
| 0
| 2
| 4
| 10
| 18
|-
|  2018 
| Second round
| 10th place
| 4
| 1
| 2
| 1
| 8
| 7
|-
| / 2022 
| Quarterfinal
| 6th place
| 5
| 3
| 0
| 2
| 13
| 5
|-
!Total!!7/15!!0 titles!!41!!16!!7!!18!!71!!66
|}

World League

FIH Pro League

EuroHockey Nations Championship*Draws include knockout matches decided on a penalty shoot-out.''

Current squad
Squad for the 2022 Women's FIH Hockey World Cup.

Head coach: Raoul Ehren

See also
 Belgium men's national field hockey team
 Belgium women's national under-21 field hockey team

References

External links

FIH profile

 
European women's national field hockey teams
National team